Aleza Lake station is on the Canadian National Railway mainline in Aleza Lake, British Columbia, Canada.  Via Rail's Jasper – Prince Rupert train calls at the station as a flag stop.

Footnotes

External links 
Via Rail Station Description

Via Rail stations in British Columbia
Railway stations in Canada opened in 1914
1914 establishments in British Columbia